Francis Barry Whitfeld (23 May 1852 – 8 January 1924) was an English cricketer.  Whitfeld's batting and bowling styles are unknown.  He was born at Hamsey, Sussex.

Whitfeld made a single first-class appearance for Sussex against the touring Australians at the County Ground, Hove, in 1878.  In this match, Whitfeld was dismissed for a single run in Sussex's first-innings by Frederick Spofforth, while in their second-innings he was dismissed for a duck by the same bowler.  He later made a second first-class appearance, this time for GN Wyatt's XI against the Australians at the United Services Recreation Ground, Portsmouth in 1886.  Whitfeld scored 5 runs in the team's first-innings, before once again falling to the bowling of Spofforth, while in their second-innings he made a single run, before being dismissed by Eugene Palmer.

He died at Lewes, Sussex, on 8 January 1924.  His son, George, played first-class cricket for Sussex.  His brother, Herbert, also played first-class cricket for the county, as well as being a two-time FA Cup winner with the Old Etonians.

References

External links
Francis Whitfeld at ESPNcricinfo
Francis Whitfeld at CricketArchive

1852 births
1924 deaths
People from Hamsey
English cricketers
Sussex cricketers